Trong Gewog (Dzongkha: ཀྲོང་) is a gewog (village block) of Zhemgang District, Bhutan.

References

Gewogs of Bhutan
Zhemgang District